Ayed Farid Zatar Cordero (born 29 March 1996) is a Paraguayan male tennis player.

He represents Paraguay at the Davis Cup, where he has a singles W/L record of 9–7, and a doubles W/L of 6–3. He also won a bronze medal in the mixed doubles event at the 2017 Bolivarian Games.

Early years
Zatar was born to Shukri Zatar Yambay and Alba Cordero Rivas on 29 March 1996 in Asunción, the oldest of five children. He began training in tennis at the age of five.

In 2012, he travelled to the United States to compete at the Orange Bowl 16 and under tournament in Plantation, Florida. He was ranked number one nationally in the 16- and 18-year-old age groups, and ranked as high as number 156 in the ITF junior rankings. By the time he arrived at Middle Tennessee State University in the United States to play college tennis, he also sat atop the men's open national rankings.

College career
In his first and only season with the Middle Tennessee Blue Raiders in 2015–16, Zatar was named all-Conference USA (C-USA) second-team in singles and first-team in doubles. At his first competition, the Dale Short Shootout, he took two wins. In late January he was named C-USA Men's Tennis Athlete of the Week for his performance in their loss against Vanderbilt, scoring the only singles victory for the Blue Raiders against the 25th-ranked team in the country. He finished the year off with a singles win against Charlotte in the C-USA Championship finals.

Zatar transferred to Georgia Gwinnett College for his sophomore season and won three straight NAIA team national championships with the Grizzlies from 2017 to 2019, compiling a record of 23–4 in singles matches and 47–5 in doubles play. In his junior year, he teamed with Valentino Caratini to win the ITA Oracle Cup Doubles Super Bowl as well as the NAIA men's doubles national championship. He then finished his senior season ranked number one in the final 2019 Oracle/ITA national doubles rankings alongside Federico Bonacia. Zatar earned NAIA All-American second-team honors in the final two years of his college career.

He earned his diploma in December 2019.

Professional career
Zatar won a bronze medal at the 2017 Bolivarian Games in Santa Marta, Colombia, teaming with Camila Giangreco Campiz in the mixed doubles event. That year he was named best male tennis player at the Tigo Sports awards show in Asunción.

Davis Cup 
He made his Davis Cup debut in 2015 in the Americas Zone Group III, defeating José Gilbert Gómez in straight sets in their first-round tie against Panama. He went undefeated in group play, winning all four of his matches, before beating Rowland Phillips in three sets in their victory over Jamaica in the promotion playoffs. In the 2016 Davis Cup Americas Zone Group II he went 2–2 overall against Venezuela and Puerto Rico, defeating the latter to avoid relegation. In 2017, he won only one of his four singles matches, defeating Haydn Lewis in straight sets while suffering two losses in doubles play with Brítez. Paraguay was relegated to Group III.

In 2018, during their opening day tie against Panama, he defeated Walner Espinoza in three sets before teaming with Diego Galeano to beat Jorge Daniel Chévez and Luis Alejandro Espinoza Bares in doubles. He won all five of his matches in group play before they fell to Honduras in the promotional playoffs, where Zatar lost in straight sets to Jaime Bendeck. In 2019 they faced group favorites Mexico in the quarterfinals in his hometown of Asunción. Although he and Juan Borna upset Santiago González and Miguel Ángel Reyes-Varela in the doubles rubber, Zatar lost both of his singles matches and Paraguay would lose the tie 1–4. At the 2020 Davis Cup World Group II Play-offs Paraguay defeated Sri Lanka 4–0 to qualify for World Group II. Zatar played the doubles rubber with Juan Borba, defeating Yasitha de Silva and Sharmal Dissanayake.

Participations: (15–10) 

   indicates the outcome of the Davis Cup match followed by the score, date, place of event, the zonal classification and its phase, and the court surface.

See also
 List of Paraguay Davis Cup team representatives

References

External links

Living people
1996 births
Paraguayan male tennis players
Middle Tennessee Blue Raiders men's tennis players
Paraguayan expatriate sportspeople in the United States
Sportspeople from Asunción
Georgia Gwinnett Grizzlies athletes
21st-century Paraguayan people